Eric Ebsworth Hutchinson (26 September 1916 – 27 January 1943) was a rugby union player who represented Australia.

Hutchinson, a lock, was born in Armidale, New South Wales and claimed a total of 2 international rugby caps for Australia. His brother Frank was also an Australian rugby union representative player.

References

Australian rugby union players
Australia international rugby union players
1916 births
1943 deaths
Royal Australian Air Force personnel of World War II
Royal Australian Air Force airmen
Australian military personnel killed in World War II
Rugby union players from Armidale, New South Wales
Rugby union locks